Pouteria splendens is a species of plant in the family Sapotaceae. It is endemic to the coastal areas of Central Chile. Due to the current rates of habitat loss, a recent study proposed to reclassify this species as Endangered. Produces an edible fruit similar to that of lucuma fruit.

References

Flora of Chile
splendens
Near threatened plants
Taxonomy articles created by Polbot